Marcin Dziuba (born 17 July 1983) is a Polish chess player holding the title of grandmaster. In 2000, he came 4th at the European U18 Chess Championship played in Chalkidiki and in 2001, he came 5th at the European U20 Championship in Patras. In 2008, he finished 3rd-4th in the Polish chess championship played in Lublin. In 2009, he finished 6th at the second grandmaster tournament in Lublin.

References

External links 

1983 births
Living people
Polish chess players
Chess grandmasters
People from Zamość
Sportspeople from Lublin Voivodeship